Herbignac is a commune in the Loire-Atlantique department in western France.

Population

See also
Château de Ranrouët
La Baule - Guérande Peninsula
Communes of the Loire-Atlantique department
Parc naturel régional de Brière

References

External links
Official Web site 

Communes of Loire-Atlantique